Gordon Dean may refer to:

 Gordon Dean (lawyer) (1905–1958), American lawyer and chairman of the US Atomic Energy Commission
 Gordon Dean (Australian politician) (born 1943), Australian politician
 Gordon Howlett Dean (1922–2008), politician in Ontario, Canada
 Gordon Dean (Alias), a character in the TV series Alias